Chaudhry Ali Akbar Khan (1911–1967) was a Pakistani politician and diplomat who stayed as the Member of Legislative Assembly 1945, Minister of Education, Minister of Industries 1950s, Federal Minister for Home Affairs (1965–1966), Ambassador to Sudan (1957–1959), Ambassador to Saudi Arabia (1959–1962).

Interior ministers of Pakistan
1967 deaths
1911 births
Pakistani MNAs 1965–1969